Seema Kapoor Chhibber is an Indian actress, dancer and model from 1970s and 1980s.

She appeared in the films Dharmatma (1975), Warrant (1975), Sewak (1975, Santo Banto (1976). She was the lead actress in Gori Dian Jhanjran (1980), a Punjabi movie in which she played the double role. She led the dancing bandwagon of the Hindi movies during 1970s.

Filmography

Films

References

External links

Living people
Indian female dancers
Indian female models
Indian film actresses
Year of birth missing (living people)